William Cheyne, 2nd Viscount Newhaven (14 July 1657 – 26 May 1728) was an English Tory politician who sat in the House of Commons from 1681 until 1707 when as a viscount in the Peerage of Scotland he was required to sit in the House of Lords.

Life
Cheyne was the son of Charles Cheyne, 1st Viscount Newhaven, and his wife Lady Jane Cavendish, daughter of the first Duke of Newcastle . He matriculated at Brasenose College, Oxford, on 14 July 1671 aged 14.

In 1681, Cheyne was elected Member of Parliament for Amersham and sat until 1687. He was elected MP for Appleby in 1689 and sat until 1695. In 1696 he was elected MP for Buckinghamshire and held the seat until 1701. In that time he was three times also elected for Amersham, but chose to sit for Buckinghamshire. He succeeded to the title and the estates at Chelsea on the death of his father in 1698.

He was re-elected MP for Buckinghamshire in 1702 and sat until 1705. He served as Lord Lieutenant of Buckinghamshire for six months in 1702 until opposed by the Whigs. He was also given the sinecure of Clerk of the Pipe in 1703 which he was able to keep until 1706 in spite of pressure from the Whigs. He was then elected MP for Amersham and sat until 1707 when under the Acts of Union 1707, having a Scottish peerage, he was required to sit in the House of Lords. He nevertheless retained an interest in politics and in 1711 regained his position as Clerk of the Pipe for life and in 1712 was made Lord Lieutenant of Buckinghamshire for the second time, losing the lieutenancy on the succession of King George I in 1714.

In 1712, he sold the estates in Chelsea to Sir Hans Sloane. Cheyne Walk was named after him

After he died, without heir, in 1728 he was buried in Drayton Beauchamp in Buckinghamshire. He was the last of the Cheyne family after whom Chenies in Buckinghamshire is named.

References

1657 births
1728 deaths
Lord-Lieutenants of Buckinghamshire
Viscounts in the Peerage of Scotland
English MPs 1681
English MPs 1685–1687
English MPs 1689–1690
English MPs 1690–1695
English MPs 1695–1698
English MPs 1698–1700
English MPs 1701
English MPs 1701–1702
English MPs 1702–1705
English MPs 1705–1707